The women's 1500 metres in speed skating at the 1964 Winter Olympics took place on January 31, at the Eisschnellaufbahn.

Records
Prior to this competition, the existing world and Olympic records were as follows:

The following new Olympic record was set.

Results

References

Women's speed skating at the 1964 Winter Olympics
Olymp
Skat